The Maryland–Virginia men's soccer rivalry, sometimes referred to as the Tydings Cup, is a rivalry between the University of Maryland Terrapins men's soccer team, and the University of Virginia Cavaliers men's soccer team. When both teams competed in the Atlantic Coast Conference, the rivalry was considered one of the most intense college soccer rivalries in the United States. Much of this is due to the program's long-standing rivalries across other sports and competing for recruits in the Mid-Atlantic, as both programs participated in the ACC for over 60 years before Maryland left for the Big Ten Conference.

Both UVA and Maryland have NCAA Championship programs in men's soccer. The Cavaliers have won seven NCAA Championships (1989, 1991, 1992, 1993, 1994, 2009, 2014) while the Terrapins have won four (1968, 2005, 2008, 2018). Both programs are also extremely consistent. As of 2019, Virginia has made the College Cup Tournament bracket an NCAA record 39 consecutive years. Maryland has made the tournament 19 consecutive years since 2001. 

Virginia is 29–16–7 in the rivalry since 1978, but Maryland started 26–1–3 between 1941 and 1977, and still leads 42–30–10 overall. The programs are coached by two of the most reputable coaches in the collegiate game who have both coached their respective programs for over 20 years. The Cavaliers are coached by George Gelnovatch while the Terrapins are coached by Sasho Cirovski.

Rivalry

History 

The origins of both programs begin in the early to mid-1940s. In 1941, Virginia began sponsoring a varsity men's soccer program, while Maryland followed suit in 1946. Prior to the 1946 meeting, Virginia's varsity team played Maryland's club team in the early 1940s in season fixtures. The first recorded meeting between both teams was on October 8, 1941 where the Maryland club team defeated the Virginia varsity team, 12-0, making it the largest defeat by either team in the series. The first meeting between the two sides as varsity programs was on October 25, 1947, where Maryland defeated Virginia 3-0.

The two teams met infrequently through the remainder of the 1940s into the mid-1950s. In 1955, the Atlantic Coast Conference began sponsoring men's college soccer as a conference sport, in which both Maryland and Virginia joined, thus causing the two teams to meet on an annual basis for the next half-century. The specific origins of the rivalry from this point are unknown, but much of it became rooted in the proximity between the two schools, and the fact Virginia and Maryland are border states.

The rivalry between both schools did not escalate until well into the 21st century, primarily due to the fact the school's until then saw periods of success on the pitch at different times. Maryland, for instance, saw much success in the NCAA Division I Men's Soccer Tournament, including a national title in the mid-to-late 1960s, whereas Virginia only qualified for one NCAA Tournament during that time. Conversely, Virginia saw much of their success come under Bruce Arena during their five-peat run in the late-1980s to mid-1990s. However, from 1976 to 1994, Maryland only qualified once for the NCAA Tournament.

In the late 1990s, the rivalry intensified with both teams regularly jockeying for ACC supremacy, which, at the time, was one of the top college conferences in the sport. This was due to the amount of national championships won, and at-large berths received in comparison to other collegiate conferences. Additionally, the rivalry intensified as both schools often tried to attract the top high school talents in the Mid-Atlantic region. Throughout the 2000s, the teams were both regularly ranked in the Top-10 of the NSCAA polls. Also during this team, Maryland's Sasho Cirovski and Virginia's George Gelnovatch were established as some of the most elite collegiate coaches in the United States. This was emphasized with Cirovski's National Coach of the Year Award in 2005, as well as both Cirovski and Gelnovatch's ACC Coach of the Year Awards earned throughout the late 1990s into the early 2000s. Additionally, during this time, three of the ten national championships in the 2000s were won by either Maryland or Virginia. Maryland won the NCAA title in 2005 and again in 2008. The following year, Virginia won the 2009 title. Furthermore, during the 2000s either one of the teams reached the College Cup (Final Four) eight of the 10 occasions. In 2011, College Soccer News rated the rivalry as the third most intense in the nation.

The general Maryland-Virginia rivalry has become less intense since Maryland moved to the Big Ten Conference during the 2010–2014 NCAA conference realignment, causing the teams to no longer meet in any sport on a regular basis. 

The final match between the two sides as ACC teams came in 2013, when the programs met in the College Cup, or Final Four, of the 2013 NCAA Division I Men's Soccer Championship. Ahead of the match, Maryland's head coach, Sasho Cirovski praised the rivalry calling it "a dream scenario." Cirovski ahead of the clash emphasized how large the rivalry is in college soccer: "I’ve said it a thousand times: It’s the best rivalry in college soccer." The American soccer publication, Soccer America called it the "end of one of college soccer's great rivalries".

The two sides met for the first time since Maryland's departure on November 22, 2015 in the 2015 NCAA Division I Men's Soccer Championship. There, Maryland posted a 1-0 victory thanks to a 38th-minute goal from Eryk Williamson. Maryland and Virginia later scheduled their first regular-season match as non-conference opponents on September 3, 2018, which ended in a scoreless draw at Audi Field in Washington.

Results 

Rankings from the Soccer America poll

Honors

See also 
 Maryland–Virginia football rivalry
 Maryland–Virginia lacrosse rivalry

Notes

References 

College soccer rivalries in the United States
Maryland Terrapins men's soccer
Virginia Cavaliers men's soccer
1941 establishments in Maryland
1941 establishments in Virginia